Hello Charlie is an Indian Hindi-language comedy film written and directed by Pankaj Saraswat and produced by Farhan Akhtar and Ritesh Sidhwani under the Excel Entertainment banner. The film stars Jackie Shroff, Aadar Jain and debutante Shhloka Pandit with Elnaaz Norouzi and Rajpal Yadav in supporting roles. The film was released on 9 April 2021 on Amazon Prime Video.

Plot
M. D. Makwana is a wanted fraudster who must escape from Mumbai after duping banks of a lot of money, for which his model girlfriend suggests disguising him as a caged gorilla so that he would be undiscovered, while at the same time, Toto, a real gorilla escapes from a crashed plane and is also declared wanted.

Chirag "Charlie" Rastogi is a young daydreamer from Indore who has been unsuccessful in whatever ventures he has partaken. Later, while at the disposition of his uncle Karsan (Darshan Jariwala), who leaves for Diu, he is assigned the job of escorting a gorilla to a circus by the model, little realizing that it is Makwana in disguise. Along the way, a series of adventures follows as Chirag finds himself confused between both Toto and Makwana, while a female circus acrobat-cum-dancer, Padma, tags along even as a forest ranger and a veterinary doctor are on the hunt for Toto.

Cast 
 Jackie Shroff as M. D. "Mac" Makwana, a wanted fraudster who disguises himself as Toto, the wanted gorilla, to escape the arms of the law.
 Aadar Jain as Chirag "Charlie" Rastogi, a young man from Indore who is assigned the task of escorting "Toto", in reality, a disguised Makwana, to the Diu Dusshera circus
 Shlokka Pandit as Padma Thakkar, a circus acrobat-cum-dancer who joins Charlie
 Elnaaz Norouzi as Mona Malhotra, a model & Mac's girlfriend
 Rajpal Yadav as Ranger Solee Topi
 Girish Kulkarni as Priyesh Patel 
 Siddhanth Kapoor as Inspector Jaidev “JD” Malhotra, Mona's brother 
 Bramha Mishra as Ardali Ram Singh, Solee's partner
 Bharat Ganeshpure as Dr. Ganatra, a vet
 Darshan Jariwala as Karsan Patel, Charlie's uncle

Production
The principal photography of the film started in mid-July 2020 during the pandemic. Actor Aadar Jain announced the wrap of the film schedule on 26 September 2020.

Soundtrack 

The film's music was composed by Tanishk Bagchi, Gourov Dasgupta, Kanika Kapoor, Rishi Rich, Kiranee and Don D Marley and the lyrics are written by Vayu, Kumaar and Shellee, while John Stewart Eduri composed the background score.

Release 
The film was released on 9 April 2021 on Amazon Prime Video.

References

External links 

 

2021 films
2020s Hindi-language films
Amazon Prime Video original films
2021 direct-to-video films
2021 comedy films
Films scored by Tanishk Bagchi
Films scored by Rishi Rich
Films scored by Kanika Kapoor
Indian comedy films